Salvia sonchifolia is a perennial plant that is native to Yunnan province in China, found growing in damp forest humus on limestone mountains at  elevation.

Inflorescences are compact 2-flowered verticillasters in terminal racemes, with a   purple corolla.

Notes

sonchifolia
Flora of China